Stende is a town in Latvia.

History 
The settlement was on the land of the manor Stende since the 14th century. The whole of it was owned originally by the lord of the manor Philipp von der Brüggen, to whom it was granted by the Livonian Order.
Rapid growth started when in 1904 a railway station Stende on the route Riga - Ventspils was established. During the First World War in 1915 Stende was occupied by German troops. To supply troops Germans had to build a better connections to the nearby port of Roja. For this purpose narrow-gauge railway or in military terms a field railway from Roja to Stende was built. From Stende supplies could be shipped via main railroad line.

In 1991, Stende was granted city rights.

See also
List of cities in Latvia

References

External links
 

Towns in Latvia
Populated places established in 1991
1991 establishments in Latvia
Talsi Municipality